Oleg Aleksandrovich Ivanov (born 4 August 1986) is a Russian footballer who plays as a central midfielder for Rubin Kazan.

Club career

Krylia Sovetov Samara
He made his debut for Krylia Sovetov on 22 March 2008.

Akhmat Grozny
On 10 January 2021, his contract with FC Akhmat Grozny was terminated by mutual consent after 10 years at the club.

Ufa
On 21 January 2021, he signed a 1.5-year contract with Ufa.

International career
Ivanov was selected for the Russian national team provisional squad for Euro 2008. He was called up after the injury to Pavel Pogrebnyak. After a long pause, he was called up for the national team again in February 2013 for a friendly against Iceland. He finally made his national team debut on 7 June 2015 in a friendly game against Belarus.

Career statistics

Club

References

External links

Ivanov's profile at Krylia website

1986 births
Footballers from Moscow
Living people
Russian footballers
Russia youth international footballers
Russia under-21 international footballers
Russia international footballers
Association football midfielders
FC Spartak Moscow players
FC Khimki players
FC Kuban Krasnodar players
PFC Krylia Sovetov Samara players
FC Rostov players
FC Akhmat Grozny players
FC Ufa players
FC Rubin Kazan players
Russian Premier League players
Russian First League players
UEFA Euro 2008 players
UEFA Euro 2016 players